Imma transversella is a moth in the family Immidae. It was described by Snellen in 1878. It is found in New Guinea, Singapore and on Sulawesi, the Sunda Islands and Java.

References

Moths described in 1878
Immidae
Moths of Asia